Taekwondo is one of the sports at the quadrennial Islamic Solidarity Games competition. Taekwondo competitions was inaugurated since the first edition in 2005.

Summary 
{| 
|valign=top|

Medal table
Updated until 2021 Islamic Solidarity Games

References

Islamic Solidarity Games
Recurring sporting events established in 2005